Noè Ponti (born 1 June 2001) is a Swiss swimmer. He competed in the men's 4 × 100 metre freestyle relay at the 2020 Summer Olympics.

References

External links
 

2001 births
Living people
Swiss male butterfly swimmers
Swiss male freestyle swimmers
Olympic swimmers of Switzerland
Swimmers at the 2020 Summer Olympics
People from Locarno
Swimmers at the 2018 Summer Youth Olympics
Medalists at the 2020 Summer Olympics
Olympic bronze medalists in swimming
Olympic bronze medalists for Switzerland
Medalists at the FINA World Swimming Championships (25 m)
Sportspeople from Ticino
21st-century Swiss people
European Aquatics Championships medalists in swimming